Cheraghlu may refer to:
 Cheraghlu, Shabestar
 Cheraghlu, Varzaqan